York Township is a township in Pottawattamie County, Iowa, USA.

History
York Township was organized about 1856.
          

Townships in Pottawattamie County, Iowa
Townships in Iowa
Populated places established in 1856

References